Man of the Year is an award commonly given by news organizations.

Man of the Year may also refer to:

Film and television
 Man of the Year (1971 film), a comedy film by Marco Vicario
 Man of the Year (1995 film), a mockumentary by Dirk Shafer
 Man of the Year (2002 film), a film starring John Ritter
 The Man of the Year (2003 film), or O Homem do Ano, a Brazilian film featuring Wagner Moura
 Man of the Year (2006 film), starring Robin Williams
 "The Man of the Year" (The O.C.), a 2006 episode of The O.C.

Music
 "Man of the Year", a 1999 song by Len from You Can't Stop the Bum Rush
 "Man of the Year", a 2007 song by Drake from Comeback Season
 "Man of the Year", a 2013 song by Logic from Young Sinatra: Welcome to Forever
 "Man of the Year", a 2013 song by Phyno from No Guts No Glory
 "Man of the Year" (song), a 2013 song by ScHoolboy Q
 "Man of the Year", a 2016 song by Dance Gavin Dance from Mothership
 Man of the Year, a 2016 studio album by Spanish hip-hop rapper Dareysteel
 "Man of the Year", a 2020 song by Juice WRLD from Legends Never Die